Sex: The Annabel Chong Story is a 1999 documentary film directed, filmed, and produced by Canada-based producer Gough Lewis, edited by co-creator Kelly Morris, and produced by Peter Carr.

The film profiles pornographic film actor Grace Quek, a.k.a. Annabel Chong, then a gender studies student at the University of Southern California, famous for setting a gang bang record in January 1995. A video of the event was released under the title The World's Biggest Gang Bang.

After the film's release, Quek criticised Lewis for misconstruing multiple events in the film and portraying events in a "misleading" way.

Synopsis
The documentary explores Quek's experiences, presenting her life as a student in Los Angeles, California and London; her native Singapore; and in the porn industry. It focuses on her reasons for working in porn, and her relationship with friends and family.

The documentary reveals to the viewers that she was gang raped as a student living in London and describes her many complex emotional issues, including signs of depression, self-harm, and substance abuse. The film also includes footage of a painful conversation in Singapore between Annabel and her mother, who, until then, didn't know about her daughter's porn career.

Response
The documentary became a hit when it was released at the Sundance Film Festival, nominated for the Grand Jury Prize.

The film's North American release was halted or minimized as a result of a court case in the Superior Court of Canada instigated by David Whitten, a B-movie distributor.

In the Guardian, Jonathan Romney (2000) wrote, "Quek's refusal to cohere as a subject is contingent on the fact that there's apparently no one looking at her: director Lewis is curiously absent, as either a character or as an invisible shaping intelligence. But he apparently was a character in her story: in interviews, Quek has denounced him for failing to reveal that he was her lover for a year during the making of Sex, something the film never even implies. That omission contributes to making the film incomplete, if not actually dishonest."

References

External links
 
 CNN.com article by Paul Clinton
 Sense of Cinema article by Dmetri Kakmi
 Interview in Spike Magazine
 Japan Times Interview
 Asia Week's Review
 Metro Active's Review
 review of Sex: The Annabel Chong Story by Gerald Peary
 Ruthless Review
 

Documentary films about American pornography
1999 documentary films
1990s English-language films
1990s American films